Bhasha Sumbli, also spelled Bhasha Sumbali,  is an Indian actress. She is best known for her pivotal role in the Hindi film The Kashmir Files.

Personal life
Sumbli belongs to the Kashmiri Pandit community. Sumbli's family left their home in Kashmir and moved to Delhi. Sumbli's mother Kshama Kaul is a Kashmiri Pandit (KP) author and poetess, and her father Agnishekhar Pandit is also a Hindi poet and author.

Role in The Kashmir Files
In the movie The Kashmir Files, Sumbli plays the central character of Sharda Pandit, which is loosely based on real-life story of Girija Tickoo, who was gang raped and brutally murdered during the 1990 Kashmir insurgency.

References

External links
 

21st-century Indian actresses
Living people
Actresses from Jammu and Kashmir
Year of birth missing (living people)